The Long Winter is a 1992 French–Spanish drama film directed by Jaime Camino and starring Vittorio Gassman, Elizabeth Hurley and Jacques Penot. It depicts a middle-class Catalan family during the Spanish Civil War. The film was entered into the 42nd Berlin International Film Festival.

Cast
 Vittorio Gassman as Claudio 
 Jacques Penot as Ramón Casals 
 Elizabeth Hurley as Emma Stapleton 
 Jean Rochefort as Jordi Casals 
 Adolfo Marsillach as Casimiro Casals 
 Asunción Balaguer as Assumpta de Casals 
 Teresa Gimpera as Lola de Casals 
 Ramon Madaula as Simi Casals 
 Àlex Casanovas as Fernando Casals 
 Judit Mascó as Mercedes Casals 
 Jordan Giralt as Juanito Casals 
 Yaiza Pérez as Flora Casals 
 Sergi Mateu as Ramon Casals Jr. 
 José Luis López Vázquez as Tio Paco 
 Sílvia Munt as Amelia 
 José Luis de Vilallonga as Conde de Santbenet
 Hermann Bonnin as Walter

References

External links

1992 films
Spanish drama films
French drama films
1992 drama films
1990s Spanish-language films
Films directed by Jaime Camino
Spanish Civil War films
1990s French films
1990s Spanish films